Lachnocnema kiellandi is a butterfly in the family Lycaenidae. It is found in Tanzania. The habitat consists of forests.

References

Endemic fauna of Tanzania
Butterflies described in 1996
Taxa named by Michel Libert
Miletinae